Botryogen is a hydrous magnesium sulfate mineral with formula: MgFe3+(SO4)2(OH)·7H2O. It is also known as quetenite.

It crystallizes in the monoclinic prismatic system and typically occurs as vitreous bright yellow to red botryoidal to reniform masses and radiating crystal prisms. It has a specific gravity in the range 2 to 2.1 and Mohs hardness in the range of 2 to 2.5.

It occurs in arid climates as a secondary alteration product of pyrite-bearing deposits.

It was first described in 1828 for an occurrence in the Falu mine of Falun, Dalarna, Sweden. It was named for its grape like appearance from Greek botrys for "bunch of grapes" and genos meaning "to bear".

References

Further reading 
 Palache, C., H. Berman, and C. Frondel (1951) Dana’s system of mineralogy, (7th edition), v. II, pp. 617–618.

Sulfate minerals
Monoclinic minerals
Minerals in space group 14